Spencer's Mountain is a 1963 American family drama film written, directed, and produced by Delmer Daves from the 1961 novel of the same name by Earl Hamner Jr. and starring Henry Fonda and Maureen O'Hara The supporting cast features early appearances in their careers by James MacArthur, Veronica Cartwright, and Victor French, while longtime Hollywood actor Donald Crisp portrays "Grandpa", his final screen role, and Wally Cox, Virginia Gregg, Lillian Bronson, Whit Bissell and Dub Taylor also appear. The movie, although set in Wyoming rather than the Blue Ridge Mountains of Virginia, is a forerunner (or early alternate version) of the television series The Waltons.

Plot
The film centers on the trials and tribulations of the Spencers, a family living in the Grand Teton Mountains of Wyoming during the early 1960s. As the patriarch of a large and growing family, dirt-poor Clay Spencer is fiercely independent, yet dedicated to his family. He navigates issues of religion and education in order to eke out a brighter future for his family.

Eldest son Clayboy aspires to attend college and build a career away from the mountain. To do so, he must earn a scholarship and be approved by university officials. He fears his rough-hewn family, particularly father Clay Sr., may handicap him in these pursuits.

Cast
 Henry Fonda as Clay Spencer
 Maureen O'Hara as Olivia Spencer
 James MacArthur as Clayboy Spencer
 Donald Crisp as Grandpa Spencer
 Wally Cox as Preacher Goodman
 Mimsy Farmer as Claris Coleman
 Virginia Gregg as Miss Parker
 Lillian Bronson as Grandma Spencer
 Whit Bissell as Dr. Campbell
 Hayden Rorke as Colonel Coleman
 Kathy Bennett as Minnie-Cora Cook
 Dub Taylor as Percy Cook
 Hope Summers as Mother Ida
 Ken Mayer as Mr. John

Unbilled

 Susan Young as Shirley Spencer 
 Gary Young as Mat Spencer 
 Michael Young as Mark Spencer 
 Ricky Young as Luke Spencer 
 Rocky Young as John Spencer 
 Veronica Cartwright as Becky Spencer
 Kym Karath as Pattie-Cake Spencer
 Barbara McNair as graduation singer

 Mike Henry as Spencer brother
 Victor French as Spencer brother
 Larry D. Mann as Spencer brother
 Med Flory as Spencer brother
 Michael Greene as Spencer brother
 Jim O'Hara (Maureen O'Hara's brother) as Spencer brother
 Bronwyn FitzSimons [Maureen O'Hara's daughter] as Dean Beck's secretary
 Rory Mallinson as campus cop

Production
Spencer's Mountain features the majestic scenery of Wyoming's Teton Range, as photographed by cinematographer Charles Lawton in color using Panavision. It was filmed in and around the town of Jackson and features the nearby Chapel of the Transfiguration. Although the original novel was set in the Appalachians of Virginia, Hamner said in 1963 that Daves wanted more imposing mountains to emphasize the characters' isolation and struggles with their environment.

The novel and the film became the basis for the long-running television series The Waltons, which premiered in 1972. The series switched the setting from the film's Wyoming back to the novel's Virginia, and placed the action in 1933 during the Great Depression. The series also differed from both the film and novel by playing down many of the adult themes, including alcoholism and infidelity, to suit the standards of early-70s family television. Spencer's Mountain was the second of three films co-starring Henry Fonda and Maureen O'Hara. Twenty years earlier they starred in the war drama Immortal Sergeant (1943) and, ten years after Spencer's Mountain, played the leads in the made-for-television film adaptation of John Steinbeck's novel The Red Pony (1973), directed and co-written by Spencer's Mountain second unit director Robert Totten.

Reception
In May 1963, The New York Times' critic Bosley Crowther contrasted the “slicked up...synthetic and essentially insincere” film with the novel, “(which) tells a very real and very moving story of a dirt-poor family that lives in the hard-scrabble, unglamorous mountains of southwest Virginia.”

Film critic Judith Crist, writing in the New York Herald Tribune, criticized the adult aspects of the movie's plot, saying it showed "sheer prurience and perverted morality," and adding that "it makes the nudie shows at the Rialto look like Walt Disney productions."

References

External links
 
 
 
 
 Cactus Pryor Interviews Henry Fonda about Spencer's Mountain (1963)
 Celebrities Attend Dedication of Spencer's Mountain (1963)

1963 films
1963 drama films
American drama films
1960s English-language films
Films about families
Films based on American novels
Films directed by Delmer Daves
Films scored by Max Steiner
Films set in the 1960s
Films set in Wyoming
Films shot in Wyoming
The Waltons
Warner Bros. films
1960s American films